Patrick J. Healy was a judge of the Court of Quebec, Criminal and Penal Division, to which he was appointed in 2007. He has currently been appointed to the Quebec Court of Appeal. Prior to his appointment, he was a professor at the McGill University Faculty of Law, from which he graduated in 1981. He has served as Editor-in-Chief of the McGill Law Journal and has been called one of the most important Constitutional and criminal law experts in Canada. Healy's 2009 acquittal of an HIV-positive man from sexual assault charges made news when he admitted that the man likely committed the acts in his mind but that there was no way of definitively determining he was the guilty party. Healy is the first vice president of the Executive Committee of the Canadian Institute for the Administration of Justice. He is also a full member of the McGill Centre for Human Rights and Legal Pluralism.

References

Academic staff of the McGill University Faculty of Law
Judges in Quebec
Living people
McGill University Faculty of Law alumni
Year of birth missing (living people)
McGill Law Journal editors